The Borlasbach  is a river of Saxony, Germany. It is a left tributary of the Rote Weißeritz, which it joins near Rabenau.

See also
List of rivers of Saxony

Rivers of Saxony
Rivers of Germany